Epiblema gibsoni is a species of moth of the family Tortricidae. It is found in North America, where it has been recorded from Arkansas, Illinois, Indiana, Kentucky, Michigan, Mississippi, Missouri, Ohio, North Carolina and South Carolina.

The length of the forewings is 6–9 mm. The forewings have a lavender tint. Adults are on wing from early June to late August.

Etymology
The species is named for Loran D. Gibson for his contributions to the knowledge of Kentucky Lepidoptera.

References

Moths described in 2003
Eucosmini
Moths of North America